Theresa: The Body of Christ is a 2007 biopic written and directed by Ray Loriga and starring Paz Vega as the title character, Saint Teresa of Ávila. It is a Spanish–British–French co-production.

Cast

Production 
A joint Spain–United Kingdom–France co-production, the film was produced by Iberoamericana Films, Future Films and Artédis. Shooting locations include the Ciudad de la Luz in Alicante, Ávila, Portugal, Trujillo, Soria and Segovia.

Release 
The film was theatrically released in Spain on 9 March 2007.

Reception 
The Spanish Episcopal Conference did not like the film: the Spanish bishops criticised the film for its erotic representation of the saint's visions, exemplified by the poster's depiction of the hand of Christ touching the arm of the naked Teresa.

See also 
 List of Spanish films of 2007

References
Citations

Bibliography

External links
 
 
 
Stills from the film at CinEmpire.com

2007 films
Films set in Spain
2000s Spanish-language films
Films about Catholicism
Films shot in Madrid
Spanish drama films
Sacred feminine
Films shot in the province of Ávila
Films shot in the province of Cáceres
Films shot in the province of Soria
Films shot at Ciudad de la Luz
2000s Spanish films
2000s French films
2000s British films
French drama films
British drama films